Afonso V of the Congo (Ndo Mfunsu V in Kikongo and Afonso V in Portuguese) was a Kinlaza manikongo of the Kingdom of Kongo from 1785 to 1787. He succeeded to his brother José I of Kongo without any struggle in April 1785 and was part of the southern faction of the Kanda Kinzala based in Nkondo. He was a king known for his piety and took the pompous title of the powerful Dom Alfonso V, King of Congo, ruler of part of Ethiopia in his letters.  It is possible he was poisoned by his successor in order to seize the throne. His sudden death caused a period of turmoil within the nation that would not end until Henrique II took the throne.

References

Sources 

1787 deaths
Manikongo of Kongo